10th Aerobic Gymnastics World Championships were held in Ulm, Germany from 25 to 27 April 2008.

Results

Women's Individual

Men's Individual

Mixed Pair

Trio

Group

Medal table

References
FIG official site

Aerobic Gymnastics World Championships
Aerobic Gymnastics World Championships
International gymnastics competitions hosted by Germany
2008 in German sport